Aleksandrovich (also Alexandrovich) is a Russian-language patronymic and surname. The surname corresponds to the Polish surname Aleksandrowicz.

The surname Aleksandrovich may refer to:

Mikhail Alexandrovich (1914–2002), Latvian tenor, and cantor 

Russian-language surnames